Soul Station is an album by jazz saxophonist Hank Mobley that was released in 1960 by Blue Note Records. It is considered by many critics to be his finest album.

Recorded at the Van Gelder Studio and rooted in the hard bop style, Mobley's quartet features Art Blakey (his past bandleader in the Jazz Messengers), and two bandmates from his time in the Miles Davis Quintet, Wynton Kelly and Paul Chambers. The album's bookends are two standards, "Remember" by Irving Berlin and "If I Should Lose You" by Ralph Rainger and Leo Robin. Between these standards are four new Mobley compositions, featuring the bluesy title track and the uptempo "This I Dig of You."

In the liner notes to the Rudy Van Gelder CD edition, jazz critic Bob Blumenthal explains how the album is understood to be, for Mobley, what Saxophone Colossus or Giant Steps were for Sonny Rollins or John Coltrane respectively. Blumenthal goes on to describe the recording  as "one of the finest programs of music on Blue Note or any other label." Awarding the album five stars, AllMusic reviewer Stacia Proefrock concluded, "Overall, this is a stellar set from one of the more underrated musicians of the bop era."

Track listing
All compositions by Hank Mobley, except where noted.

Side one

Side two

Personnel
 Hank Mobley – tenor saxophone
 Wynton Kelly – piano
 Paul Chambers – bass
 Art Blakey – drums

Album production
 Alfred Lion – producer
 Rudy Van Gelder – mixing
 Francis Wolff – cover photo
 Reid Miles – cover design

Charts

External links 
 Hank Mobley's 'Soul Station' At 60: How The Tenor Saxophonist's Mellow Masterpiece Inspires Jazz Musicians In 2020 on Grammy Awards

References

Hard bop albums
Hank Mobley albums
1960 albums
Blue Note Records albums
Albums produced by Alfred Lion
Albums recorded at Van Gelder Studio